Battle of Al Faw may refer to one of the following:

 First Battle of Al Faw, February 1986, a battle of the Iran-Iraq War
 Second Battle of Al Faw, April 1986, a battle of the Iran-Iraq War
 Battle of Al Faw (2003), March 2003, one of the first battles of the Iraq War